Admiral Jackson may refer to:

Henry Jackson (Royal Navy officer) (1855–1929), British Royal Navy admiral
Mary M. Jackson (born 1966), U.S. Navy vice admiral
Richard H. Jackson (1866–1971), U.S. Navy admiral
Ronny Jackson (born 1967), U.S. Navy rear admiral
Samuel Jackson (Royal Navy officer) (1775–1845), British Royal Navy rear admiral
Thomas Jackson (Royal Navy officer) (1868–1945), British Royal Navy admiral
Thomas Sturges Jackson (1842–1934), British Royal Navy admiral